The Kansas State Wildcats football team competes as part of the NCAA Division I Football Bowl Subdivision (FBS), representing the Kansas State University in the Big 12 Conference. Since the establishment of the team in 1896, Kansas State has played in 22 bowl games. This total includes six appearances in the current "New Year's Six" major bowl games (the Rose, Sugar, Fiesta, Orange, Cotton, and Peach Bowl). The team played in two Fiesta Bowls during the Bowl Championship Series (BCS) era, one Fiesta Bowl during the Bowl Alliance era, and three Cotton Bowl appearances prior to it being included in the College Football Playoff.

Kansas State's first bowl game was in 1982, under coach Jim Dickey.  The team was defeated by the Wisconsin Badgers in the 1982 Independence Bowl.

Bowl games

Table reference

College Division/Other Bowl Games
As a supplement to the list, the following games were regular season games that some have considered special and may be confused as a bowl.  These games are not considered "bowl games" but are included here as a reference.

 1992 Coca-Cola Classic vs. Nebraska Cornhuskers (L 38–24)
 2000 Eddie Robinson Classic vs. Iowa Hawkeyes (W 27–7)
 2003 BCA Classic vs. California Golden Bears (W 42–28)
 2021 Allstate Kickoff Classic vs. Stanford Cardinal (W 24–7)

Notes

References

Kansas State Wildcats

Kansas State Wildcats bowl games